"A Walk in the Park" is a song by Japanese recording artist Namie Amuro from her third studio album Concentration 20 (1997). The song was released as the album's lead single on November 27, 1996. It was written, composed and produced by Tetsuya Komuro. The song is a dance track, which features instrumentation from guitars, synthesizers, organs, keyboards and drums. "A Walk in the Park" and "Can You Celebrate?" were both theme songs for Maxell UD commercials and Whisper was used as the background music for the Maxell MD74 commercial.

"A Walk in the Park" received positive reviews from music critics, who complimented the song's production and composition. The song became her fourth number one single on the Oricon Singles Chart and her fourth million-selling single in Japan. The accompanying music video features Amuro in a white room, wearing a black tuxedo and a white coat and dress. Amuro has performed the song in a number of live performances throughout Japan.

Background and release
"A Walk in the Park" is the first single from her third studio album Concentration 20 (1997). Japanese producer and composer Tetsuya Komuro had written, arranged and composed the song. Komuro collaborated with Amuro on her second studio album Sweet 19 Blues (July 1996) and his final work with Amuro was her album Break the Rules (December 2000). It was recorded in Tokyo, Japan and was mixed and mastered by Eddie Delena.

Charts
Released four months after the massive success of her first studio album Sweet 19 Blues, it became her fourth number one and million selling single. The single spent 7 weeks into the top 5 and 8 weeks in Top 10 totally. She performed the song at the Japan Cable Awards in December 1996 and at the Japan Gold Disc Awards in February 1997. A Walk in the Park was the 13th best selling single of the year 1997.

Track listing
 "A Walk in the Park (Straight Run)" (Tetsuya Komuro) – 5:39
 "A Walk in the Park (Fabulous Freak Brothers Mix)" (Tetsuya Komuro) – 7:01
 "A Walk in the Park (Back Track with TK)" (Tetsuya Komuro) – 5:36

Personnel
 Producer, Composer, Arranger, Synthesizer Programming, Manipulating, Keyboards, Chorus - Tetsuya Komuro
 Guitar - Michael Thompson
 Bass - Kenji Sano
 Mixing - Eddie DeLena
 Additional Production (Track 2) - Gary Adante, Robert Arbittier

Charts
Oricon Sales Chart (Japan)

References

1996 singles
Namie Amuro songs
Oricon Weekly number-one singles
Songs written by Tetsuya Komuro
1996 songs
Avex Trax singles